This is a record of Israel at the 1997 World Championships in Athletics.

Men's 100 metres

Heats

Men's marathon

Men's triple jump

Qualifying round

Men's high jump

Qualifying round

Final round

Men's pole vault

Qualification - Group A

Final round

Men's javelin throw

Qualification - Group A

Nations at the 1997 World Championships in Athletics
World Championships in Athletics
1997